Zetnet was one of the UK's oldest ISPs (see list of UK ISPs by age) and according to New Scientist is the brainchild of Ghufar Razaq and Graeme Storey. It was founded in Lerwick, in the Shetland Isles by Ghufar Razaq, Graeme Storey, Tim Cole and Paul Martin. According to the Shetland Fishing News, a journal of Shetland's fishing industry, the company began trading on 13 October 1994.

History 

In October 1994, Zetnet began trading as Zetnet Services. It became a Limited Company (Zetnet Services Ltd) in October 1995.

In 1996, Zetnet was thrown into the media spotlight through what nearly became a landmark legal case testing UK copyright laws on the internet.

In March 1999 Zetnet founded online gaming service Netgames UK, the brainchild of Sandy Sandom and Phil O'Malley. It was originally a wholly owned subsidiary, sharing Zetnet technical staff, but was sold in May 2000 and incorporated as Netgames UK Ltd. The company was run successfully until August 2001 when reports of a press release detailing a fall-out between Netgames UK management and its technical staff were seen.

In 1999, Zetnet hosted the CVS tree for the eggdrop project, an IRC bot. The CVS was maintained by staff member Jonathan Miles (Cybah), who also coordinated and committed patch contributions for the Eggdrop Development Team.

In 2001, Zetnet took over Charis Internet Services, a Birmingham-based ISP.

In January 2002 Zetnet bought the customers of troubled ISP Cloud-Nine Communications, which had suffered a DDoS attack. Cloud Nine were based in Basingstoke, run by CEO Emeric Miszti and Operations Director John Parr.

On May 12, 2003, Zetnet co-founder and Technical Director, Tim Cole, died. The Zetnet home page was changed during the following week, to say "with great sadness Zetnet announces the death of Tim Cole co-founder director" and also "Tim had been suffering with heart problems for many years. On Sunday evening he had a heart attack from which he did not recover". According to an unconfirmed source, Tim's headstone says simply "internet pioneer" and can be found in the yard of the Dunrossness Kirk, Dunrossness in the south of Shetland.

In February 2005, Zetnet closed its head office in the Shetland Isles. According to The Shetland News, much of Zetnet's operations were run from an office in Manchester at the time.

In November 2005 Zetnet Services Ltd was put into administration owing creditors a large sum of money and an administration committee was later formed by the creditors to investigate the finances of the company.

The administrators sold the assets and good will of the company to Zetnet Limited which was formed by some of the existing directors of Zetnet Services Ltd and some new shareholders - with John Hyslop as managing director.

In May 2007, a press release surfaced on PRWeb which indicated that Zetnet Ltd was to be purchased by Solutrea Ltd, a "wireless and digital signage solutions provider". John Hyslop was quoted as Zetnet's Managing Director at the time. The deal was reported to have been worth "£857,000 in cash upon closing". However, the agreement was "subject to approval by the Powerstar International Inc. (TSX.V : PWS), board of directors and the Toronto Ventures Exchange". No further information could be found to confirm that this deal was ever completed.

In July 2008, Zetnet was acquired by Breathe Networks Limited (BNL), according to a news article by ISPreview.co.uk. Zetnet joined other BNL brands such as breathe, macunlimited, Ecosse, Intensive Networks, Bush Internet and Fast4. Although BNL stated an intent to operate Zetnet independently, it subsequently consolidated a number of Zetnet's services into its own platform during the first half of 2009, with some problems.

On 16 July 2009 Zetnet Ltd was placed into administration.

Breathe Migration 

Zetnet's reputation took a severe nose dive in July 2009 when Breathe's attempts to change the Zetnet email system resulted in thousands of users being unable to access their email for weeks. This tarnished the company's reputation badly with many established long term customers leaving Zetnet to find a reliable ISP.

Breathe had taken the remarkable decision not to notify any of Zetnet's customers before moving them to their servers, nor had they (Breathe) taken a secure backup of the Zetnet database of e-mail username and password combinations prior to the failed migration process. This resulted in an unprecedented request for customers to complete a form on the Zetnet website detailing their full e-mail address and associated password. Regrettably, even this 'Last-ditch' attempt to recover some credibility failed in many cases and there was no way that 'Catch-all' addresses could be recovered by this process.

During the chaos which followed, customers were unable to contact Zetnet by telephone or e-mail to resolve website and e-mail issues. It seems that this loss of service is a regular feature of Breathe acquisitions.

Legal case 
In 1996, Zetnet was caught in the middle of a legal case between two of its local customers, The Shetland Times and The Shetland News, over copyright infringement. The web sites of both customers were hosted by Zetnet.

References 

Former internet service providers of the United Kingdom
Telecommunications companies established in 1994